Bhupendra Singh (born 20 May 1960) is an Indian politician and a former minister of Home affairs in government of Madhya Pradesh and current Minister of Urban Development and Housing minister in Government of Madhya Pradesh.

From 2013 to December 2018, he was a cabinet minister in the Government of Madhya Pradesh, for the IT and transport department, later in 2016 his IT department has been switched with home department after Babulal Gaur skipped the post. In the 2009 general election, he was elected to the 15th Lok Sabha from the Sagar Lok Sabha constituency of Madhya Pradesh after two consecutive huge marginal losses in assembly election 2003 & 2008 from Surkhi & Khurai respectively.

He was also a member of Madhya Pradesh Legislative Assembly during 1993-2003 from Surkhi.

Currently he is minister for Urban Development & Housing, Govt. of M.P.

References

External links
 Department of public relation website 



India MPs 2009–2014
1960 births
Living people
People from Sagar district
Bharatiya Janata Party politicians from Madhya Pradesh
Madhya Pradesh MLAs 1993–1998
Madhya Pradesh MLAs 1998–2003
Lok Sabha members from Madhya Pradesh
State cabinet ministers of Madhya Pradesh
Madhya Pradesh MLAs 2013–2018
Madhya Pradesh MLAs 2018–2023